Sports channels are television speciality channels (usually available exclusively through cable and satellite) broadcast sporting events, usually live, and when not broadcasting events, sports news and other related programming.

The first sports channel was from the SportsChannel networks, which went on the air in 1977 with the original SportsChannel (now MSG Plus). ESPN began broadcasting in 1979.  Since then, many channels have surfaced around the world, many focusing on one sport in particular, or one region of a country, showing only their local team's games. These networks have greatly improved the availability of sports broadcasts, generating opportunities such as the ability for one person to see every single game their team plays over the course of the season.

In the United States, these channels broadcast most regular season games of major pro sports league and many other sports as well, with over the air television networks stepping in during the weekends or special events (all-star games, championships, etc.).

Africa

Algeria
 El Heddaf TV
 DZ Sport
 Former channels 
 Stade News
 Kawaliss TV

Benin
† – Channel primarily televises others types of entertainment channels, only offers sports part-time
 ADO TV†

Cameroon
† – Channel primarily televises others types of entertainment channels, only offers sports part-time
 CRTV Sports and Entertainment Channel†

Côte d'Ivoire
 RTI Sport TV

Egypt
 Nile sport
 On Time sports
 On Time sports 2
 On Time sports 3
 ZAMALEK TV
 Al AHLY TV
 Free Sports
 Mazzika Sports
 Former channels
 ON Sport
 Time sports

Kenya
 Bamba Sport
 365Sports Entertainment

Morocco
 Arryadia

Nigeria
 Kwese Free Sports
 Supersport Nigeria
 NTA Sports 24
 StarTimes Sports
 Talent Sport

South Africa
 SABC Sport
 Super Sport
 TellyTrack
 ESPN
 ESPN2

Sudan
 Sudan Sports
 Merrikkh TV
 Al-Hilal TV

Uganda
 Kwese Sports
 StarTimes Sports
 Super Sport
 Zuku Sports
 Azam TV Sports Channel

Americas

Argentina
 Telecanal Plus
 Telesistema Plus 
 TVC Plus 
 CMA Plus 
 ESPN Latin America
 ESPN 2
 ESPN 3
 ESPN +
 América Sports
 TyC Sports 
 TyC Sports 2
 TyC Sports 3
 TyC Sports 4 HD 
 TyC Sports 5 HD
 TyC Sports Plus 
 TyC Max (main pay-per-view signal)
 TyC Max 2 (second pay-per-view signal) 
 TyC Max 3
 TyC Max 4
 TyC Max 5 
 TyC Max Plus 
 Multideporte (exclusive of Multicanal) 
 Cable Sports                                                                                              
 Cable Sports 2
 Cable Sports 3
 Cable Sports 4 HD
 Cable Sports 5 HD
 Cable Sports Plus
 Cable Max
 Cable Max 2
 Cable Max 3
 Cable Max 4  
 Cable Max 5
 Cable Max Plus 
 Gala Sport (exclusive of VCC)
 DeporTV 
 Fox Sports Latin America
 Fox Sports 2
 Fox Sports 3
 Golf Channel
 365 Sports 
 AM Sports (America Sports)
 Poker Sports
 El Garage TV
 Discovery Turbo
 PADMANI TV
 GOL TV
 DSports
 UFC Network

Brazil
National sports networks

 SporTV
 SporTV 2
 SporTV 3
 ESPN Brasil
 ESPN
 ESPN 2
 ESPN Extra
 Fox Sports
 Fox Sports 2
 Combate (PPV of MMA and Boxing Signal)
 Premiere FC (pay-per-view of soccer signal)
 BandSports
 TNT Sports (TNT and Space)
 Woohoo
 Golf Channel

Canada
National sports networks
† – Channel primarily televises others types of news or entertainment channels, only offers sports part-time

 Anthem Sports & Entertainment (Fight Network, GameTV, Game+)
 Bell Media (CTV†, CTV 2†, ESPN Classic Canada, RDS, RDS2, RDS Info, TSN1, TSN2, TSN3, TSN4, TSN5)
 Groupe TVA (TVA Sports, TVA Sports 2, TVA Sports 3)
 OLN
 REV TV Canada
 Rogers Sports & Media (Sportsnet East, Sportsnet Ontario, Sportsnet West, Sportsnet Pacific, Sportsnet One, Sportsnet Canucks, Sportsnet Flames, Sportsnet Oilers, Sportsnet 360)
 Sportsman Channel
 Wild TV Inc. (The Cowboy Channel Canada, RFD-TV, Water Television Network, Wild TV

Premium, streaming and ethnic sports networks

 ATN
 ATN Cricket Plus
 ATN DD Sports
 CBN
 beIN Sports Canada
 DAZN
 EuroWorld Sport
 FuboTV
 HPItv
 NBA TV Canada
 OneSoccer
 Sportsnet World
 WWE Network

Chile
 ESPN Latin America
 ESPN 3
 ESPN +
 TNT Sports
 Canal del Deporte Olímpico
 Fox Sports Latin America
 GOL TV
 DSports
 Golf Channel
 Discovery Turbo
 Vive! Deportes
 Teletrak TV
 UFC Network

Colombia
 ESPN Latin America
 ESPN 2
 ESPN 3
 Claro Sports Colombia
 Fox Sports Latin America
 Fox Sports 2
 Fox Sports 3
 GOL TV
 DSports
 Golf Channel
 Win Sports
 Discovery Turbo
 Caracol Televisión
 RCN Television
 UFC Network

Costa Rica
 Repretel
 Teletica
 TD+
 Tigo Sports
 FUTV
 TUDN
 Fox Sports 2
 Fox Sports 3 
 GOL TV
 ESPN Latin America
 ESPN 2
 ESPN 3
 ESPN 4
 ESPN Extra
 Golf Channel
 UFC Network
 Discovery Turbo

Ecuador
 Claro Sports
 DSports
 Ecotel TV
 Ecuavisa
 Gama TV
 Red Telesistema
 TC Televisión
 ESPN Latin America
 ESPN 3
 ESPN +
 GOL TV
 Discovery Turbo
 UFC Network
 Fox Sports Latin America
 Golf Channel

Honduras
 Todo Deportes TV

Mexico
 ESPN Latin America
 ESPN 2
 ESPN 3
 Fox Sports Latin America
 GOL TV
 TyC Sports
 Televisa Deportes Network
 TVC Deportes
 Claro Sports*
 Golf Channel
 PxTV
 Cable Sports
 Aym Sports
 UFC Network
 Sky Sports Mexico

Paraguay
 Unicanal Plus 
 Ocho TV Plus
 Tigo Sports
 Tigo Sports 2
 Tigo Sports 3
 Tigo Sports 4
 Tigo Sports 5 
 Tigo Sports Plus 
 Tigo Max (Five channels) 
 Unicanal Deportes
 Tigo Alternative Signal One 
 Tigo Alternative Signal Two
 Tigo Alternative Signal Three 
 Tigo Alternative Signal Four
 Movistar Sports
 Movistar Sports 2
 Movistar Sports 3 
 Movistar Sports 4 HD
 Movistar Sports 5 HD 
 Movistar Deportes Plus
 Movistar Max (Five channels) 
 Ocho Deportes
 Movistar Alternative Signal One
 Movistar Alternative Signal Two 
 Movistar Alternative Signal Three
 Movistar Alternative Signal Four 
 Personal Sports
 Personal Sports 2
 CMM Sports
 CMM Sports 2 
 DeporTV
 Copaco TV Sports 
 Channel 18
 DIRECTV Sports 
 Fox Sports Latin America
 Fox Sports 2
 Fox Sports 3 
 GOL TV
 ESPN Latin America
 ESPN 2
 ESPN 3
 ESPN +
 Golf Channel
 UFC Network
 Discovery Turbo

Peru
 ESPN Latin America
 ESPN +
 ESPN 2
 ESPN 3
 Movistar Deportes
 Fox Sports Latin America
 DSports
 GOL TV
 Golf Channel
 Toros TV
 Jcp TV
 Discovery Turbo
 Best Cable Sports

United States
National sports networks
† – Channel primarily televises others types of news or entertainment channels, only offers sports part-time

 AFN Sports
 Warner Bros. Discovery (TBS†, TNT†, TruTV†, HBO Max†)
 beIN Sports USA
 beIN Sports Xtra
 BYU TV (otherwise Brigham Young University-owned family and faith network features coverage of BYU Cougars sporting events)
 Comcast/NBCUniversal (NBC Sports, CNBC†, NBC†, Golf Channel, Olympic Channel, Peacock†, SYFY†, Telemundo Deportes, Universo†, USA Network†)
 DAZN
 Eleven Sports Network
 Disney (ABC/ESPN on ABC†, ACC Network, ESPN, ESPN2, ESPN3, ESPN+, ESPN Deportes, ESPNews, ESPNU, SEC Network)
 Fight Network
 Fox Corporation (BTN, FOX†, Fox Deportes, Fox Soccer Plus, Fox Sports, FS1, FS2)
 FuboTV (Fubo Cycling, Fubo Sports Network)
 GOL TV
 MAVTV
 MLB Network
 MLB Strike Zone
 NBA TV
 Apple TV
 NFL Network
 NFL RedZone
 NHL Network
 Outdoor Channel
 Pac-12 Network
 Pursuit Channel
 Ringside Network
 Sportsman Channel
 Stadium
 The Ski Channel
 Tennis Channel
 TUDN (Univision†, UniMás†, Galavisión†)
 TVG Network
 TVG2
 Paramount (CBS†, CBS Sports, CBS Sports Network, CBS Sports HQ, Nickelodeon†, Paramount+†)
 Willow
 World Fishing Network 
 StreamEast (United States) 

Regional sports networks

 Altitude
 AT&T SportsNet (Northwest, Pittsburgh, Rocky Mountain, Southwest)
 Bally Sports (Arizona, Detroit, Florida, Great Lakes, Indiana, Kansas City, Midwest, New Orleans, North, Ohio, Oklahoma, San Diego, SoCal, South, Southeast, Southwest, Sun, West, Wisconsin)
 Cox Sports Television
 NBC Sports Regional Networks (Bay Area, California, Chicago, Washington, Boston, Northwest, Philadelphia, SNY (8%))
 Longhorn Network
 Marquee Sports Network
 MASN
 MSG, MSG Plus and MSG Western New York
 NESN and NESN Plus
 Spectrum Sports (Spectrum SportsNet, Spectrum SportsNet LA, Spectrum Deportes)
 YES
 YurView California

Uruguay
 VTV
 VTV Plus 
 Nueve TV Plus 
 Channel 20 of TCC
 Tigo Sports 
 Tigo Sports 2 
 Tigo Sports 3
 Tigo Sports 4
 Tigo Sports 5 
 Tigo Sports Plus 
 Tigo Max (Five channels) 
 Movistar Sports 
 Movistar Sports 2 
 Movistar Sports 3
 Movistar Sports 4
 crocs
 Movistar Sports Plus 
 Movistar Max (Five channels)
 Personal Sports
 Personal Sports 2
 CMM Sports
 CMM Sports 2 
 ANTEL TV Sports
 DeporTV 
 TCC Sports
 ESPN Latin America
 ESPN 2
 ESPN 3
 ESPN +
 Fox Sports Latin America
 GOL TV
 DSports
 DSports 2
 DSports +
 DSports Fight
 Golf Channel
 Discovery Turbo
 UFC Network

Venezuela

Current channels
 ByM Sports
 Meridiano TV

Former channels
 Canal Plus TV
 DirecTV Sports Venezuela
 ESPN Latin America
 ESPN 3
 ESPN +
 DirecTV Sports
 Fox Sports Latin America
 GOL TV
 Golf Channel
 Discovery Turbo
 UFC Network

Asia

Azerbaijan
CBC Sport
Idman TV

Afghanistan
 RTA Sports
 Tolo TV 
 Lemar TV
 Ariana TV 
 3 Sport

Bangladesh
 T Sports
 GTV
 Star Sports 1 (Bangla)
 Sony Sports TEN 1 
 Sony Sports TEN 2
 Sony Sports TEN 3
 Sony Sports TEN 4
 Sony Sports TEN 5
 sports18
 Star Sports 2
 Star Sports Select 1
 Star Sports Select 2

Bhutan
 DD Sports
 Star Sports First
 SONY SPORTS TEN 1
 SONY SPORTS TEN 2
 SONY SPORTS TEN 3
 SONY SPORTS TEN 4
 SONY SPORTS TEN 5 
 Star Sports Select HD 1
 Star Sports Select HD 2
 Star Sports HD 1

Brunei
 Astro SuperSport 1
 Astro SuperSport 2
 Eurosport
 Golf Channel
 SPOTV
 Astro Arena
 WWE Network
 BeIN Sports
 BeIN Sports Max
 Golf Channel
 Astro Cricket
 Premier Sports
 Astro SuperSport 3
 Astro SuperSport 4
 Astro SuperSport 5
 Astro Arena 2

Former channels
 eGG Network

China
 Anhui TV Sports Channel
 BTV Sports
 CCTV-5
 CCTV-5+
 CCTV-16
 JSBC Sports & Leisure Channel
 Shandong Sports Channel
 Shenzhen Sports Channel
 SMG Great Sports
 Tianjin Sports Channel

Hong Kong

† – Channel primarily televises others types of business news channels, only offers sports part-time

 Astro Cricket
beIN Sports
Cable Sports
 Cable Sports 2
 Cable HD603
 Now 621–626 (Premier League Channels)
Now Golf
Now Sports
Premier Sports
TVB Finance, Sports & Information Channel†

India

Current channels
Star Sports Network
Star Sports 1 (including HD)
Star Sports 2 (including HD)
Star Sports 3
 Star Sports Select 1 (including HD)
 Star Sports Select 2 (including HD)
 Star Sports First
Star Sports 1 Hindi (including HD) 
 Star Sports 1 Tamil
 Star Sports 1 Telugu
 Star Sports 1 Kannada
Sony Sports Network
Sony Sports Ten 1 (including HD)
Sony Sports Ten 2 (including HD)
Sony Sports Ten 3 (including HD)
Sony Sports Ten 4 (including HD)
Sony Sports Ten 5 (including HD)
 Eurosport (including HD)
 1Sports
 DD Sports
Sports18 Network
 Sports18 1 (including HD)
 Sports18 2
 Sports18 Khel
 Sports18 Hindi
 Sports18 Tamil
 Sports18 Kannada
 Sports18 Telugu

Former channels
 Neo Sports
 Neo Prime
 Star ESPN
 Sony ESPN
 Sony Ten Golf HD

Indonesia
† – Channel primarily televises others types of entertainment channels, only offers sports part-time

Current channels
 beIN Sports Indonesia
 Champions TV 1
 Champions TV 2
 Champions TV 3
 Champions TV 5
 Champions TV 6
 Champions TV World Cup 1
 Champions TV World Cup 2
 Eurosport
 Fight Sports
 BALAP
 Golf+
 Golf Channel
 Historical Sports
 Horizon Sport
 ID.Cyclist
 Liga Mahasiswa
 Moji†
 Mola
 MNC Sports
 MNC Sports 2
 MNC Sports 3
 NBA TV
 Premier Sports
 Soccer Channel
 SPOTV
 TVRI Sport
 Usee Sports 
 Usee Sports 2
 TSB Now 1
 TSB Now 2
 TSB Now 3

Former channels
 BeritaSatu Sports
 Champions TV 4
 Fox Sports (1, 2, 3)
 SportOne

Iran
 IRIB Varzesh Iran Sports Channel
 IRIB TV3

Israel
 Eurosport 1 (including Eurosport HD)
 Eurosport 2
 Sport 1 (including Sport 1 HD)
 Sport 2
 Sport 3
 Sport 4
 Sport 5 (including Sport 5 HD)
 Sport +5
 Sport +5 GOLD
 Sport +5 Live (including Sport +5 Live HD)
 Extreme Sports Channel
 ONE (including ONE HD)
 Trace Sport
 Ego Total (fighting channel)
 Former Channels
 NBA TV
 Neo Sports
 ESPN
 Fox Sports (including Fox Sports HD)

Japan
 DAZN
Fighting TV Samurai
 Fishing Vision
 Golf Channel
 Golf Network
 J-Sports 1
 J-Sports 2
 J-Sports 3
 J-Sports 4
 Table Tennis Badminton TV752
 Nittele G+

Jordan
 Jordan sports
 Jordanian Sports Channel
 ON Sport
 JSC Sports
 Al Faisaly TV

Kazakhstan
 QSport
 QazSport
 Setanta Kazakhstan

Kuwait
 KTV Sport
 KTV Sport Plus

Kyrgyzstan
 KTRK Sport

Malaysia
 Astro Arena
 Astro Arena 2
 Astro Box Office Sport
 Astro Cricket
 Astro SuperSport
 Astro SuperSport 2
 Astro SuperSport 3
 Astro SuperSport 4
 Astro SuperSport 5
 BeIN Sports
 BeIN Sports MAX
 Eurosport HD
 SPOTV
 Golf Channel
 Premier Sports
 Sukan RTM
 Unifi Sports HD
 WWE Network
 TVSN

Former channels
 eGG Network

Mongolia
 MNB Sport HD
 Sportbox

Myanmar
 SKYNETSPORT 1
 SKYNET SPORT 2
 SKYNET SPORT 3
 SKYNET SPORT 4
 SKYNET SPORT 5
 SKYNET SPORT 6
 SKYNET SPORT +
 SKYNET SPORT HD
 Canal+ SPORT HD
 MRTV SPORT

Nepal
 NTV Plus
 Sony Sports Ten
 Star Sports
 Action Sports 
 AP1 TV

Pakistan
 A Sports HD
 Geo Super HD
 PTV Sports HD
 Ten Sports HD

Philippines
 Sports Illustrated Television
 One Sports 
 PBA Rush
 Pinoy Xtreme Channel
 TAP Sports
 Solar Sports
 NBA TV Philippines
 Premier Sports
 SPOTV
 UAAP Varsity Channel

Former Channels
 Basketball TV 
 Liga 
 Balls 
 ABS-CBN Sports and Action 
 NBA Premium TV

Qatar
 Alkass 1, 2, 3, 4, 5, 6, 7 & 8
 beIN Sports
 beIN Sports News
 beIN Sports 1
 beIN Sports 2
 beIN Sports 3
 beIN Sports 4
 beIN Sports 5
 beIN Sports 6
 beIN Sports 7
 beIN Sports 1 Premium
 beIN Sports 2 Premium
 beIN Sports 3 Premium
 beIN Sports XTRA 1
 beIN Sports XTRA 2
 beIN Sports 1 English
 beIN Sports 2 English
 beIN Sports 3 English
 beIN Sports 1 French
 beIN Sports 2 French
 beIN Sports 3 French
 beIN Sports AFC
 beIN Sports AFC 1
 beIN Sports AFC 2
 beIN Sports AFC 3
 beIN Sports AFC 4
 beIN Sports NBA
 beIN Sports Max 1
 beIN Sports Max 2
 beIN Sports Max 3
 beIN Sports Max 4
 beIN Sports Max 5
 beIN Sports Max 6
 Former channels
 Al Jazeera Sports 1 & 2

Saudi Arabia

Current channels
 KSA Sports 1 HD 
 KSA Sports 2 HD
 KSA Sports 3 HD
 KSA Sports 4 HD
 SSC 1–8

Former channels
 MBC Pro Sports 1–4
 Linesport
 ART Sports 1–6

Singapore

Current channels
 Astro Cricket
 Fight Sports
 SPOTV
 Star Cricket
 Golf Channel
 Eurosport
 Premier Sports
 BeIN Sports
 BeIN Sports MAX
 mio Sports
 mio Stadium
 Hub Sports

Former channels
 All Sports Network
 Football Channel
 Goal TV 1
 Goal TV 2
 Okto
 Fox Sports (1, 2, 3)

South Korea
 KBS N Sports
 MBC Sports+
 SBS Sports
 SBS Golf
 SPOTV
 SPOTV2
 SPOTV Golf & Health
 SPOTV ON
 SPOTV ON2
 SkySports
 IB SPORTS
 Golf Channel Korea
 JTBC Golf&Sports
 JTBC Golf
 TvN Sports

Sri Lanka
 Channel Eye
 CSN
 MTV Sports
 Sony Sports TEN 1
 Sony Sports TEN 2
 Sony Sports TEN 3
 Sony Sports TEN 4
 Sony Sports TEN 5
 TEN Cricket Sri Lanka
 Star Sports 1
 Star Sports 2
 Star Sports HD1
 Star Sports HD2
 Eurosport

Syria
 Syria Sport TV
 ON Sport HD

Tajikistan
 Varzish TV
 Futbol FFT

Turkmenistan
 Turkmenistan Sport

Thailand

Current channels
 True Sport 2
 True Sport 5
 True Sport 6
 True Sport 7
 True Sport HD
 True Sport HD2
 True Sport HD3
 True Sport HD4
 True Tennis HD
 All Sports Network
 GMM Sport
 SPOTV

Former channels
 Fox Sports (1, 2, 3)

United Arab Emirates
 Abu Dhabi Sports 1, 2, 3, 4, 5 & 6
 Yas Sports
 Edge Sports
 Dubai Sports 1, 2, HD2, 3 & 4
 Dubai Racing 1 & 2
 Sharjah Sports
 Al Dar Sports 1, 2, 3 & 4
 RMC Sport 1 & 2
 Former channels
 Abu Dhabi Sports Extra
 OSN Sports 1, 2, 3, 4 & 5
 OSN Sports Cricket
 The Sports Channel 1, 2 & 3

Uzbekistan
 MTRK Sport
 Futbol TV
 Uzreport TV

Vietnam
† – Channel primarily televises others types of programs, only offers sports part-time

Current channels
 VTV2†
 VTV3†
 VTV5†
 VTV9†
 VTC3†
 ON Sports+†
 ON Sports
 ON Sports Action
 ON Sports News
 ON Football
 ON Golf 
 HTV Thể Thao
 K+CINE (including K+1)†
 K+LIFE (including K+NS)†
 K+SPORT2 (including K+PC)
 K+SPORT1 (including K+PM)
 SKTV Sports 1 (including SKTV16)
 SKTV Sports 2 (including SKTV6)
 SKTV Sports 3 (including SKTV20)
 SKTV Sports 4
 SCTV15
 SCTV17
 SCTV22

Former channels
 Fox Sports
 Fox Sports 2
 Fox Sports 3
 VTV6†

Europe

Albania
 RTSH Sport
 SuperSport

Andorra
 Esport3

Austria
 DAZN
 ORF Sport +
 Sky Sport Austria
 Eurosport

Bulgaria
 BNT 3
 RING
 Nova Sport
 Diema Sport
 Diema Sport 2
 Diema Sport 3
 Eurosport 1
 Eurosport 2

Belgium
 Be Sport
 Eleven Sports
 Eurosport 1
 Eurosport 2
 Play Sports
 Proximus 5
 Proximus 11
 Proximus 11+
 Sport 10
 VOOsport
 VOOsport World

Former channels
 Sporza

Croatia
 Arena Sport
 GP1
 Nova Sport
 SPTV

Cyprus
 CytaVision Sports

Czech Republic
 ČT sport
 Nova Sport 1
 Nova Sport 2
 Nova Sport 3
 Nova Sport 4
 Canal+ Sport
 Fast&FunBox
 FightBox
 Eurosport 1
 Eurosport 2
 Sport 1
 Sport 2
 Sport 5
 O2TV Sport
 O2TV Fotbal
 O2TV Tenis

Denmark

† – Channel primarily televises others types of entertainment channels, only offers sports part-time

 TV 2 Sport
 TV 2 Sport X
 TV3 MAX†
 TV3 Plus†
 TV3 Sport
 C More Golf
 Eurosport 1
 Eurosport 2
 V Sport Golf
 V Sport Live
 V Sport Ultra

Estonia
 Eurosport (Baltics)
 TV3 Sport

Finland

† – Channel primarily televises others types of entertainment channels, only offers sports part-time

 C More Max†
 C More Sport 1
 C More Sport 2
 Eurosport 1
 Eurosport 2
 V Sport 1
 V Sport + Suomi
 V Sport 1 Suomi
 V Sport 2 Suomi
 V Sport Football
 V Sport Golf
 V Sport Live
 V Sport Premium
 V Sport Ultra
 V Sport Vinter

Former channels
 Rutuu+ Urheilu 1
 Rutuu+ Urheilu 2

France
 Canal+ Sport
 Canal+ Sport 360
 Canal+ Foot
 Infosport+
 Eurosport 1
 Eurosport 2
 beIN Sports
 RMC Sport
 Foot+
 Golf+
 Rugby+
 Automoto La chaîne
 Equidia
 La Chaîne L'Équipe

Germany
 Sky Sport (Germany)
 Sport1
 Sportdigital
 Eurosport
 DAZN

Greece
 Nova Sports
 Cosmote Sport

Former channels
 ERT Sports

Hungary
 M4 Sport
 M4 Sport +
 Spíler1 TV
 Spíler2 TV
 Arena4
 Match4
 Eurosport 1
 Eurosport 2
 Sport1
 Sport2

Former channels
 Digi Sport 1
 Digi Sport 2
 Digi Sport 3

Iceland
 Stöð 2 Sport
 Stöð 2 Sport 2

Ireland
 BT Sport
 Eurosport
 Sky Sports
 Viaplay Sports

Former channels
 Eir Sports
 Virgin Media Sport

Italy
 DAZN
 Eleven Sports
 Eurosport
 Rai Sport HD
 Sky Sport Italy
 Sportitalia

Kosovo
 ArtSport
 K Sport
 SuperSport

Latvia
 Best4Sport TV
 Eurosport (Baltics)
 TV3 Sport

Lithuania
 Eurosport (Baltics)
 Sport1
 TV3 Sport

Luxembourg
 Kombat Sport

Netherlands
 ESPN
 Eurosport (Netherlands)
 Extreme Sports Channel
 Sport1 (Netherlands)
 Ziggo Sport

Former channels
 NPO Sport

Norway
 TV 2 Sport
 TV 2 Sport Premium
 C More Hockey
 C More Live
 Eurosport 1
 Eurosport 2
 Eurosport Norge
 Eurosport Pluss (1-12)
 V Sport +
 V Sport 1
 V Sport 2
 V Sport 3
 V Sport Golf
 V Sport Premier League (1-4)
 V Sport Live
 V Sport Ultra

Poland
 Canal+ Sport
 Eleven Sports
 Eurosport
 Motowizja
 Polsat Sport
 Polsat Sport Premium
 SportKlub
 TVP Sport

Portugal
 Eleven Sports 1
 Eleven Sports 2
 Eleven Sports 3
 Eleven Sports 4
 Eleven Sports 5
 Eleven Sports 6
 Eurosport 1
 Eurosport 2
 Sport TV +
 Sport TV 1
 Sport TV 2
 Sport TV 3
 Sport TV 4
 Sport TV 5

Romania

† – Channel primarily televises others types of entertainment channels, only offers sports part-time

 Digi Sport 
 Eurosport 1
 Eurosport 2
 Orange Sport
 Prima Sport
 Pro Arena†

Russia
 Match TV

Former channels
 Eurosport 1
 Eurosport 2
 Russia 2

Slovakia
 :ŠPORT
 JOJ Šport
 Arena Sport 1
 Arena Sport 2
 Premier Sport 1
 Premier Sport 2
 Sport 1
 Sport 2
 Sport M

Former channels
 Trojka (STV)
 Digi Sport
 Digi Sport 2
 Digi Sport 3
 Digi Sport 4
 Digi Sport 5
 Digi Sport 6
 Slovak Sport.TV
 Slovak Sport.TV 2
 Slovak Sport.TV 3
 Orange Šport
 Orange Šport 2
 Orange Šport 3
 Orange Šport 4

Slovenia
 Arena Sport
 Arena eSport
 Sportklub
 Šport TV

Spain
 Barça TV
 DAZN
 Eurosport 1
 Eurosport 2
 GOL PLAY
 Movistar Plus+
 Deportes por Movistar Plus+
 Golf por Movistar Plus+
 LaLiga por Movistar Plus+
 Liga de Campeones por Movistar Plus+
 Real Madrid TV
 Teledeporte

Sweden
 C More Sport
 C More Fotboll
 C More Golf
 C More Hockey
 C More Live
 Sportkanalen
 Eurosport 1
 Eurosport 2
 V Sport 1
 V Sport Extra
 V Sport Football
 V Sport Golf
 V Sport Live
 V Sport Motor
 V Sport Premium
 V Sport Ultra
 V Sport Vinter

Switzerland
 Canal+ Sport Suisse
 DAZN
 Eurosport
 Sky Sport Schweiz

Turkey
 TRT Spor
 TRT Spor Yıldız
 A Spor
 Eurosport 1
 Eurosport 2
 sportstv

Ukraine
 Eurosport 1
 Eurosport 2
 XSPORT

Former channels
 Football 1/Football 2

United Kingdom
 BoxNation
 BT Sport
 Eurosport
 Extreme Sports Channel
 Ginx TV
 Racing TV
 Sky Sports
 Viaplay Sports
 Viaplay Xtra

Former channels
 ITV Sport Channel
 Sportystuff

Oceania

Australia

 beIN Sports 1
 beIN Sports 2
 beIN Sports 3
 ESPN
 ESPN2
 Eurosport 1
 Fox Cricket (Fox Sports 501)
 Fox Footy (Fox Sports 504 sometimes Fox Sports 503 if there are 2 games on at a time)
 Fox League (Fox Sports 502)
 Fox Netball (Fox Sports 505)
 Fox Sports 503
 Fox Sports 506
 Fox Sports 508
 Fox Sports More+ (Fox Sports 507)
 Fox Sports News (Fox Sports 500)
 Kayo Sports
 Main Event
 Optus Sport
 Racing.com
 Skuff TV
 Sky Racing
 Stan Sport

New Zealand
 ESPN
 ESPN 2
 Sky Sport
 Spark Sport
 The Rugby Channel

Former channels
 TVNZ Sport Extra

See also

 Regional sports network

References

sports